Achieva Credit Union, is a state chartered credit union regulated under the authority of the National Credit Union Administration (NCUA). On November 1, 2009, Sarasota Coastal Credit Union merged with Achieva Credit Union, which is headquartered in Dunedin, Florida.  The credit union has more than $2 billion in assets and more than 160,000 members in 15 counties.

History
Achieva Credit Union was started as a teachers’ credit union in 1937 in Pinellas County with $99.25. Throughout the years, their field of membership and number of counties served has expanded. The merger is seen as an excellent fit between the two credit unions, as the membership base is similar and the combined field of membership now encompasses counties from Hernando to Charlotte on the West Coast of Florida.

Membership
Eligibility for Achieva Credit Union membership is open to anyone who is related to a current Achieva member; or individuals, trusts, associations, organizations and legal entities who live or work in Pinellas, Pasco, Hernando, Manatee, Charlotte, Sarasota, Lee, Collier, Hendry, Hardee, Highlands, Monroe, Glades and Hillsborough counties. There are 26 branches across their service region.

Organization
Achieva Credit Union is governed by a volunteer Board of Directors, elected by and from its membership. The Board has nine members, who serve for three-year terms. Board members can be re-elected to consecutive terms by the membership.

The credit union is a member of the Florida Credit Union League, through which it is associated with the Credit Union National Association.

Services
Achieva Credit Union offers savings accounts, checking accounts, IRA accounts, and certificates of deposit, as well as consumer loans, credit cards, mortgages, home equity loans and HELOCs.

References

External links
 Official Achieva Credit Union website
 National Credit Union Administration

Credit unions based in Florida
Banks established in 1953
Companies based in Sarasota, Florida
Dunedin, Florida